János Veres (born 5 February 1957) is a Hungarian politician, who served as Minister of Finance between 2005 and 2009. He was a member of the Hungarian Socialist Workers' Party since 1980. He served as first secretary of the party's committee of Nyírbátor from 1988 to 1989. He was a founding member of the Hungarian Socialist Party (MSZP) in 1990. He became a member of the National Assembly of Hungary in 1994. He served as deputy chairman of the Committee of Economics many times. He also served as mayor of Nyírbátor since 2002, but resigned in the next year, because he was appointed state secretary of the Ministry of Finance. Veres became a member of the MSZP's presidency in 2004. Ferenc Gyurcsány appointed him Minister of Finance in 2005.

Controversies
Veres had many conflicts with the HírTV, which supports the conservative right-wing politics and the biggest opposition party, Fidesz. On 19 December 2006 he head the reporter, who wanted to asking him. Two years later, in March 2008 he shoved away the correspondent deliberately. On the next day the two journalists appeared at the press conference in a visibility waistcoat. Then Veres declared that the HírTV's colleagues can't approach him. The minister repeatedly threatened the channel with a judicial lawsuit, when the reporters asked about his sons' charge.

References
 Veres János országgyűlési adatlapja
 Biography

1957 births
Living people
People from Nyírbátor
Hungarian Socialist Party politicians
Members of the Hungarian Socialist Workers' Party
Finance ministers of Hungary
Members of the National Assembly of Hungary (1994–1998)
Members of the National Assembly of Hungary (1998–2002)
Members of the National Assembly of Hungary (2002–2006)
Members of the National Assembly of Hungary (2006–2010)
Members of the National Assembly of Hungary (2010–2014)